Lemieux Island is a small island in the middle of the Ottawa River at the edge of Nepean Bay in the National Capital Region of Canada. The island lies between Gatineau, Quebec, and the national capital, Ottawa, Ontario. Administratively being a part of the latter, it is crossed by the Chief William Commanda Bridge and serves a site for the water filtration plant.

The island also features a dog park.

See also 
 Letsgomoose
 Quebec Gatineau Railway

References 

River islands of Ontario
Landforms of Ottawa